KSLM-LD, UHF digital channel 27, is a low-powered AMGTV-affiliated licensed to Salem, Oregon, United States. The station is owned by Northwest Television. The station covers the Willamette Valley, within the Portland, Oregon television market. The station's transmitter is located in the Eagle Crest area in the West Salem hills in Polk County.

The change in channel was prompted by interference from another station operating on channel 16, KORS-CA. At the time KSLM began operation, KORS was licensed on channel 36. KORS was subsequently granted a construction permit to operate on channel 16 from a tower in Portland.

History
Operated by Northwest Television, LLC, the station began operation in September 2008, as a digital translator for KWVT-LP. In April 2009, KSLM signed an affiliation agreement with Retro TV. The KWVT programming remains available as a digital subchannel.

Digital channels

The station's digital signal is multiplexed:

Translators

References

External links
KSLM Homepage
Northwest Television Homepage

Television stations in Oregon
Mass media in Salem, Oregon
2008 establishments in Oregon
Low-power television stations in the United States
YTA TV affiliates